Panni may refer to:

Plural of Latin pannus

Geography
 Panni, Apulia, village in the province of Foggia in southeast Italy
 Panni (Pashtun tribe), in Afghanistan and Pakistan

People
 Antonio Maria Panni (1730-1790), Italian painter and art historian
 Daud Khan Panni (died 1715), Mughal commander
 Humayun Khan Panni (died 2006), Bangladesh politician
 Morshed Ali Khan Panni, Bangladesh politician
 Muhammad Bayazeed Khan Panni, Bangladesh politician, doctor, writer, and social reformer
 Nicoletta Panni (1933–2017), Italian lyric soprano
 Raissa Khan-Panni, also known as Raissa  (born 1971), English singer-songwriter
 Wazed Ali Khan Panni (1871–1936), Bengali Zamidar, politician, and philanthropist